The 2019 Ogun State House of Assembly election was held on March 9, 2019, to elect members of the Ogun State House of Assembly in Nigeria. All the 26 seats were up for election in the Ogun State House of Assembly. APC won 15 seats, APM won 7 seats, ADC won 3 seats, while PDP won 1 seat.

Upon the opening of the 9th State House of Assembly, Olakunle Oluomo (APC-Ifo I) was elected as Speaker of the House while Oludare Kadiri (APC-Ijebu North I) and Yusuf Sherif Abiodun (APC-Ado Odo Ota I) became Deputy Speaker and House Leader, respectively.

Results

Ifo I 
APC candidate Olakunle Oluomo won the election.

Ijebu North II 
APC candidate Oludare Kadiri won the election.

Ifo II 
APM candidate Ganiyu Oyedeji won the election.

Imeko Afon 
ADC candidate Jemili Akingbade won the election.

Abeokuta North 
APM candidate Modupe Mujota won the election.

Abeokuta South I 
APC candidate Adejojo Yusuf won the election.

Abeokuta South II 
APC candidate Adeyemi Ademuyiwa won the election.

Ado Odo Ota I 
APC candidate Yusuf Sherif Abiodun won the election.

Ado Odo Ota II 
APM candidate Lamidi Musefiu won the election.

Yewa North I 
ADC candidate Adegoke Olusesi won the election.

Yewa North II 
ADC candidate Haruna Abiodun won the election.

Yewa South 
APM candidate Bolanle Lateefat won the election.

Ewekoro 
APM candidate Amosun Yusuf won the election.

Ijebu East 
APC candidate Adams Isaac won the election.

Ijebu North I 
PDP candidate Abiodun Sylvester won the election.

Ijebu North East 
APC candidate Fasuwa Abayomi won the election.

Ijebu Ode 
APC candidate Oduwole Kemi won the election.

Ikenne 
APC candidate Olakunle Sobukola won the election.

Ipokia 
APM candidate Sikiru Ajibola won the election.

Obafemi Owode 
APC candidate Soneye Kayode won the election.

Odeda 
APC candidate Elemide Oludaisi won the election.

Odogbolu 
APC candidate Bello Atinuke won the election.

Ogun Waterside 
APC candidate Akeem Agbolade won the election.

Remo North 
APC candidate Osho Solomon won the election.

Sagamu I 
APC candidate Abdulbashir Oladunjoye won the election.

Sagamu II 
APM candidate Adeniran Ademola won the election.

References 

Ogun State House of Assembly elections
House of Assembly
Ogun